George Spencer Monk (12 September 1884 – 29 March 1973) was an American physicist. He was an expert in optics for different types of electromagnetic radiation who worked on the Manhattan Project to develop the first nuclear weapon. He later worked for the United States Atomic Energy Commission (USAEC).

Biography
He gained his BSc in 1914 at the University of Chicago. and continued to work at the university. He married Ardis Taylor, a mathematician from the University of Chicago, who later worked for the USAEC and under Eugene Wigner during his project to construct a nuclear reactor. Monk became an associate professor of physics at the Ryerson Laboratory of the University of Chicago from 1929 to 1949. During his early career at the university, from 1924 to 1929 he co-wrote papers with the dean of the physics department, Henry Gale, on the atomic spectra of chlorine and hydrogen, and also with future Nobel Prize-winner Robert S. Mulliken on fine structure of bands in atomic spectra and the Zeeman effect. He was made a fellow of the American Physical Society in 1928. The same year, he wrote a paper with the simple title "A mounting for the plane grating". Twenty-one years later, A.H. Gillieson published a paper titled "A new spectrographic diffraction grating collimator". It was eventually made clear that the invention was not "new" and is now referred to as the "Monk-Gillieson monochromator" or "Monk-Gillieson mounting".

Monk was one of those present when the world's first nuclear reactor, Chicago Pile-1, went critical on 2 December 1942. While he was working on the Manhattan Project (he was chief of the Technical Section 6 (Optics)), he was one of the signatories to the Szilárd petition addressed to president Truman in 1945, which requested that terms of surrender be provided to the Empire of Japan before the usage of a nuclear weapon. After the end of World War II, he continued to work for the Lawrence Berkeley National Laboratory in the same role as the chief of the optical department. He published Light : Principles and Experiments in 1937 and Optical Instrumentation in 1954, the latter with W.H. McCorkle

He died on 29 March 1973 in Boulder, Colorado, survived by his wife. He was buried at Mountain View Memorial Park in Boulder.

References

1884 births
1973 deaths
American physicists
University of Chicago alumni
University of Chicago faculty
Manhattan Project people
Fellows of the American Physical Society